Buti Bori is a local urban rail station at  Butibori, an industrial suburb of Nagpur in Maharashtra.

Location 
It is situated 28 km from Nagpur Junction.

Gallery

References

External links 

Railway stations in Nagpur district
Nagpur CR railway division